Hilde Hagerup (born 26 February 1976) is a Norwegian novelist and author of children's literature. She is the daughter of Klaus Hagerup. She received the Norwegian Critics Prize for Best children's book in 2002 for Løvetannsang.

References

Norwegian Critics Prize for Literature winners
1976 births
Living people
Norwegian women novelists
Norwegian women children's writers
21st-century Norwegian women writers
People educated at Atlantic College